Navapur railway station is located on Gujarat–Maharashtra state border in Navapur town of Nandurbar district, Maharashtra. Its code is NWU. It has three platforms. Passenger, MEMU, Express and Superfast trains halt here.

About Navapur

 Navapur railway station is located on the border of Gujarat and Maharashtra
 Navapur is a Tehsil of Nandurbar district, Maharashtra.

Trains

The following trains halt at Navapur railway station in both directions:

 12834/33 Howrah–Ahmedabad Superfast Express
 19045/46 Tapti Ganga Express
 22947/48 Surat–Bhagalpur Express
 19025/26 Surat–Amravati Express
 19003/04 Khandesh Express
 59013/14 Surat-Bhusawal Passenger
 69179/80 Udhna-Paldhi MEMU

References 

Railway stations in Nandurbar district
Mumbai WR railway division